Tan Weiwei (born 8 October 1982), also known as Sitar Tan, is a Chinese singer and actress.

She was the runner-up of the third season (2006) of Super Girl, a singing contest in China. In 2015, she participated I Am a Singer (season 3), where it was revealed that she is a vegan.

Early life
Tan Weiwei was born in Fushun County, Zigong, Sichuan province, on 8 October 1982. She spent her childhood in Zigong with her parents. As a teenager, she became interested in pop music. In 1997, she won first places in the Students Art Festivals in both her primary and secondary schools. At the end of 1998, she began to perform in bars. When she was 19, she entered the Sichuan Conservatory of Music, where many the biggest names of the mainland Chinese Mandopop singer had been trained. Although her marks were not very high, she managed to improve her vocal technique thanks to Lanka Dolma, a Chinese vocal trainer of Tibetan ethnicity, who discovered the hidden talent of the young singer. Thanks to Lanka Dolma, she learned many traditional singing techniques which nowadays, Tan uses in her recordings. And at the same year, she was honored as Top Ten singers of Sichuan province.

Music career
In 2020 Tan Weiwei released her album '3811'. Since July, Tan Weiwei has been releasing new singles from her album “3811,” with each of the 11 songs chronicling stories of women from diverse backgrounds, including a taxi-driving single mom, an illiterate elderly woman, and a female poet from the Tang dynasty. In December she released the song 'Xiao Juan'. “Erase our names, forget our beings, same tragedy continues and repeats,” Tan sings. (Xiao Juan is a name, like Jane Doe in English, that is used to anonymize women's names in court cases.) The groundbreaking song, which went viral in China, refers to domestic violence and misogyny, citing recent violent deaths of real women in China.

Personal life 
She married Taiwanese actor David Chen after he proposed in 2016 during a trip to Mount Kailash. In 2018, they collaborated on a song for the TV series The Legend of Jade Sword (莽荒紀) which he acted in.

Discography

Studio albums

Extended Plays:
 (2016) 夏長 Long Summer EP
 (2016) 秋收 Golden Harvest EP
 (2017) 春生 Season of Rebirth EP
 (2017) Winter EP
 (2020) 姐码3811 Sister Ma 3811 EP
 (2020) 姐放3811 Sister Fang 3811 EP

Singles
 "If I Haven’t Fell Into Love" (如果我没有爱过)(September 2006)
 "I forgot to say" (我忘了说) (January 2008)
 "Encounter" (遇见) (August 2010)
 "In the Shu river" (在束河里) (October 2010)

Filmography
Film
Chengdu, I Love You (2009)
 East Meets West 2011 (2011)
 Secret Garden (2012)
 Forget All Remember (2014)
 Love Education (2017)

Variety shows

 Keep Running - Season 4 Episode 6 (guest)

References

External links
 Tan Weiwei's Sina Weibo

1982 births
Living people
People from Zigong
Super Girl contestants
Musicians from Sichuan